The 2019 EuroLeague Final Four was the concluding EuroLeague Final Four tournament of the 2018–19 EuroLeague season, the 62nd season of Europe's premier club basketball tournament, and the 19th season since it was first organised by Euroleague Basketball. It was the 32nd Final Four of the modern EuroLeague Final Four era (1988–present), and the 34th time overall that the competition has concluded with a final four format. The Final Four was played at the Fernando Buesa Arena in Vitoria-Gasteiz, Spain, on 17 and 19 May 2019.

Venue

On May 15, 2018, Euroleague Basketball announced that the Final Four will be held in the Fernando Buesa Arena in Vitoria-Gasteiz. It was the first time ever the event would be hosted in Vitoria. The arena hosted the 1996 FIBA Saporta Cup Final, in which local Saski Baskonia won the title and also hosted the 2010 EuroCup Finals.

The Final Eight of the Copa del Rey (Spanish Cup) was played four times at Buesa Arena (2000, 2002, 2008 and 2013).

On 9 April 2012, at the game of Caja Laboral against Real Madrid, Fernando Buesa Arena registered the record of attendance in a basketball game of the Spanish Liga ACB with 15,504 spectators.

Background

Real Madrid
Real Madrid failed to defend the title after finishing the regular season in the third position, with a 22–8 record, and being the first qualified team by beating Panathinaikos OPAP 3–0 in the playoffs. This was their seventh Final Four in the last nine editions and the third consecutive.

Coach Pablo Laso could have won his third title in his sixth Final Four appearance.

Bracket

Semifinals

Semifinal A 
Turkish champions Fenerbahçe Beko returned to the Final Four to make it their fifth straight appearance. Led by head coach Željko Obradović, the all-time record holder for most EuroLeague championships won by a head coach, it defeated Žalgiris Kaunas 3–1 in the play-offs, to clinch a semi-final spot.

Anadolu Efes qualified for its first Final Four since 2001, this being their third appearance in total, after finishing the regular season in the 16 th (last) place the previous year. The club beat Barcelona Lassa 3–2 in the play-offs.

Larkin set a new EuroLeague Final Four record for Performance Index Rating with 43.

Semifinal B 
Russian champions CSKA Moscow returned to the Final Four to make it their eighth consecutive Final Four appearance. The club beat Kirolbet Baskonia 3–1 in the play-offs.

Defending Euroleague and spanish champions Real Madrid would play its third consecutive Final Four appearance. The match would be a re-match of the 2018 Semifinal A, which Real Madrid won on their way to their 10th title. Real Madrid beat Panathinaikos OPAP 3–0 in the play-offs.

Third place game
Fenerbahçe and Real Madrid faced off in a re-match of the 2018 championship game. Facundo Campazzo set an all-time record for assists in a Final Four game, with 15. He surpassed Terrell McIntyre's record from 2008.

Championship game
The seven-time EuroLeague champions CSKA Moscow advanced to the championship game for the seventh time and first since 2016 EuroLeague Final Four. Anadolu Efes advance to the Final Four Championship Game for the first time in their history, having finished third in both previous Euroleague Final Four participations. Remarkable was that in the previous season, Efes finished sixteenth and last in the EuroLeague.

Shane Larkin broke the record for most points scored in a Final Four, with 59 total.

References

External links
Official website

Final
EuroLeague Finals
Sport in Vitoria-Gasteiz
International basketball competitions hosted by Spain
Euroleague Final Four
Euroleague Final Four